Hawinella is a genus of slender springtails in the family Entomobryidae. There are at least two described species in Hawinella.

Species
These two species belong to the genus Hawinella:
 Hawinella kuaola Christiansen & Bellinger, 1992 i c g
 Hawinella lava Bellinger & Christiansen, 1974 i c g
Data sources: i = ITIS, c = Catalogue of Life, g = GBIF, b = Bugguide.net

References

Further reading

 
 
 

Springtail genera